Mesoclemmys is a South American genus of turtle in the Chelidae family.

Species include:
 Mesoclemmys dahli (Zangerl and Medem, 1958) - Dahl's toad-headed turtle
 Mesoclemmys gibba (Schweigger, 1812) - Gibba turtle
 Mesoclemmys heliostemma (McCord, Joseph-Ouni, and Lamar 2001)
 Mesoclemmys jurutiensis Cunha, Sampaio, Carneiro, & Vogt, 2021
 Mesoclemmys nasuta (Schweigger, 1812)
 Mesoclemmys perplexa Bour & Zaher, 2005
 Mesoclemmys raniceps (Gray, 1856) - Amazon toad-headed turtle
 Mesoclemmys sabiniparaensis Cunha, Sampaio, Carneiro, Vogt, Mittermeier, Rhodin & Andrade, 2022
 Mesoclemmys tuberculata (Luederwaldt, 1926) - Tuberculate toad-headed turtle
 Mesoclemmys vanderhaegei (Bour, 1973) - Vanderhaege's toad-headed turtle
 Mesoclemmys zuliae (Pritchard and Trebbau, 1984) - Zulia toad-headed turtle
 †Mesoclemmys vanegasorum (Cadena et al., 2020) - La Victoria Formation, Laventan Colombia

References

 
Turtle genera
Taxa named by John Edward Gray